James Blackwell (born 1 April 1995) is a New Zealand rugby union player who plays for the  in the Super Rugby competition.  His position of choice is lock.

References 

New Zealand rugby union players
1995 births
Living people
Rugby union locks
Rugby union flankers
Wellington rugby union players
Hurricanes (rugby union) players
Rugby union players from Wellington City
People educated at Wellington College (New Zealand)